Chadderton is a town in the Metropolitan Borough of Oldham, Greater Manchester, England and it is unparished.  It contains 19 listed buildings that are recorded in the National Heritage List for England.  Of these, one is listed at Grade II*, the middle grade, and the others are at Grade II, the lowest grade. The area was rural until the coming of the Industrial Revolution, silk weaving arrived in the 18th century, and in the 19th and 20th centuries large cotton mills were built.  The Rochdale Canal runs through the town, and two structures associated with it are listed, a bridge and a lock.  The oldest listed buildings are farmhouses and a country house.  The later buildings reflect the growing wealth of the town, and include cotton mills, churches, civic buildings, and a war memorial.


Key

Buildings

References

Citations

Sources

Lists of listed buildings in Greater Manchester
Listed